This is a list for all the individuals that Pope Pius XI (r. 1922–39) beatified throughout his pontificate; the pope beatified 511 individuals in total.

See also
 List of people beatified by Pope Pius XII
 List of people beatified by Pope John XXIII
 List of people beatified by Pope Paul VI
 List of people beatified by Pope John Paul II
 List of people beatified by Pope Benedict XVI
 List of people beatified by Pope Francis

1920s-related lists
1930s-related lists
Beatifications by Pope Pius XI
Pius XI